Salher is a place located near Waghamba in Satana tehsil in Nashik district of Maharashtra, India.The old name of Salher was Gavalgarh, which was based on the name of the local Bhil king named Gaval Bhil, he was the discoverer of this place. It is the site of the highest fort in the Sahyadri mountains and the second highest peak at  after Kalsubai in Maharashtra and 32nd highest peak in Western Ghats. This was one of the celebrated forts of the Maratha Empire. The money acquired after raiding Surat was brought to this fort first on its way to the Maratha capital forts.

History
According to a legend, Parashurama did his Tapascharya at Salher Fort. After winning the earth and giving it as donation, he made land for himself to live in, by pushing the sea back with his arrows, right from this place. The twin fort Salota (4986 feet) is very near to Salher.

An ancient and historically significant place like this is also famous for its battles during the reign of Chatrapati Shivaji Maharaj

Salher Fort was under  Shrimant Sardar Suryajirao Kakade in 1671. The Mughals attacked the fort in 1672. Almost one lakh soldiers fought in this war. Many soldiers died in this battle but finally Shivaji Maharaj send Suryajirao Kakade who won the Battle of Salher. Of all the face to face battles between the Mughals and Suryajirao Kakade's troops, the battle of Salher takes first place. Such a big battle was not won before. The bravery and strategy used by the Maratha troops in the battle spread far and wide and increased Shivaji Maharaj's fame further. After winning Salher, the Marathas also captured Mulher and established their reign over the Baglan region. In the 18th century, the Peshwas occupied this fort and later by the British.

The Marathas defeated the Mughals at the Battle of Salher in 1672.

How to reach
The nearest town is Taharabad, it is 112 km away from Nashik via Satana. The climbing to Salher fort can be started from village-Waghambe, Salher or Maldar. It requires equal time( 2 hrs.) and effort to climb from either of the three villages. However, from Waghambe, it is a regular path that reaches in the saddle between Salota and Salher forts. Night camping can be done either at the top of Salher fort or in Forest Camping rest house at village Salher. There are no good hotels or shops in either of the three villages.

References

Gallery

Forts in Maharashtra
Nashik district
16th-century forts in India